Modesty Blaise was a 1982 American-produced one-hour television pilot produced for the ABC Network and based upon the comic strip Modesty Blaise, created by Peter O'Donnell.

This was the second attempt at adapting the comic strip as a live-action production, following a 1966 film of the same title. It was written by Stephen Zito, directed by Reza Badigi, with Barney Rosenzweig as executive producer. The plot has a few elements taken from O'Donnell's first Modesty Blaise novel (which in turn had been a novelization of a practically unused screenplay that Peter O'Donnell had written for the first Modesty Blaise film) but is largely original. Whereas Modesty in the comic strip and novels was said to be of uncertain Eastern European ancestry (but adopted England as her homeland), and her companion Willie Garvin was a Cockney, the telefilm makes both characters American.

Cast
The 50-minute program featured Ann Turkel as Modesty Blaise, Lewis Van Bergen as Willie Garvin, Keene Curtis as Gerald Tarrant, Sab Shimono as Weng and Douglas Dirkson as Jack Fraser, with Carolyn Seymour as villainess Debbie DeFarge. Though the planned TV series was never produced, the pilot was televised by the ABC network.

Story
The plot, set in what appears to be Los Angeles, involves Modesty and Willie preventing the kidnap of a young girl who turns out to be a computer genius and has been working for Tarrant's agency. Although both Modesty and Willie's back stories are given as described by O'Donnell, no explanation is provided for their North American accents or presence in California. Tarrant, as an operative of an American secret service, naturally does not have his knighthood. The super-computer they have been developing has been stolen by Debbie Defarge to use to make a killing on the New York stock exchange. Willie's knife-throwing skills and Modesty's habit of ripping off the lower part of her dress when called to action are faithfully reproduced, as is much of the banter between Willie and Modesty, but in other ways, the characters bear little resemblance to O'Donnell's literary creations.

Another attempt to adapt the comic strip took place in 2003 with the release of My Name Is Modesty.

Music

The American group Sparks wrote and recorded the theme song "Modesty Blaise" for the pilot. After the cancellation of the proposed series, Sparks released the song in Europe under the amended title "Modesty Plays" in late 1982/early 1983. The song was later re-recorded and included on their 1986 album Music That You Can Dance To.

The rest of the musical score was produced by Kevin Knelman.

Modesty Plays tracklisting
 7" vinyl (Metronome, Germany)
 "Modesty Plays" – 3:06
 "Nicotina" – 3:29

 7" vinyl (Underdog, France)
 "Modesty Plays (Long Version)" – 5:09
 "Modesty Plays (Short Version)" – 3:06

 12" vinyl (Underdog, France)
 "Modesty Plays" – 5:09
 "Angst In My Pants" – 3:20

External links
 

Peter O'Donnell
1982 television films
1982 films
Live-action films based on comics
Films based on British comics
Films based on comic strips
Television pilots not picked up as a series
1980s English-language films